Björn Schnake (born 13 December 1971) is a German Paralympic table tennis player. He won bronze in the Men's team class 6–7 at the 2020 Summer Paralympics in Tokyo with teammate Thomas Rau. For winning a bronze-medal at the Tokyo-Paralympics he was awarded by the President of the Federal Republic of Germany with Silver Laurel Leaf, Germany's highest sport-award.

References

External links
 Bjoern Schnake at ITTF Para Table Tennis
 

1971 births
Living people
German male table tennis players
Paralympic table tennis players of Germany
Paralympic bronze medalists for Germany
Table tennis players at the 2020 Summer Paralympics
Medalists at the 2020 Summer Paralympics
Recipients of the Silver Laurel Leaf
Sportspeople from Hildesheim